McKendrick is a surname. Notable people with the surname include:

Anderson Gray McKendrick (1878–1943), Scottish physician
Archibald McKendrick (1876–1960), Scottish dentist and radiology pioneer
Ewan McKendrick (born 1960), English lawyer
Jamie McKendrick (born 1955), English poet
John Gray McKendrick (1841–1926), Scottish physiologist
John McKendrick (born 1969), Scottish football referee
Melveena McKendrick (born 1941), Welsh scholar of the Spanish Golden Age
Neil McKendrick (born 1935), British historian
Robin McKendrick (born 1943), Australian politician
Wilford M. McKendrick (1870–1936), American educator
Joseph J. McKendrick (1956 - current), Australian Oncologist

See also
McKendrick, New Brunswick, unincorporated community in Canada

Surnames of Scottish origin
Anglicised Scottish Gaelic-language surnames
Anglicised Irish-language surnames